The 2011 League of Ireland Cup, also known as the 2011 EA Sports Cup, was the 38th season of the League of Ireland Cup knockout competition.

The competition was won by Derry City who defeated Cork City in the final on 24 September 2011 in Turners Cross.

A total of 27 teams entered the 2011 competition. The ten Premier Division and eleven First Division clubs were joined by four A Championship teams plus the 2010 Ulster Senior League champions, Cockhill Celtic and the Kerry District League representative side. For the Preliminary, First and Second Rounds of the competition, all participating clubs were split into 4 regional pools with the further rounds of the competition having an open draw. Shamrock Rovers, Sligo Rovers, Bohemians and St. Patrick's Athletic all received automatic byes into the second round of the competition due to each club's European football participation. The 2011 competition commenced with the preliminary round in March 2011.

Teams

Preliminary round

The draw for the preliminary round took place on 2 March 2011.

The Preliminary Round games were played on 14 March 2011.

First round

The draw for the first round took place on 2 March 2011.

The First round Games were played on 25 March, 28 March and 30 March 2011.

Pool 1

Pool 2

Pool 3

Pool 4

Second round

The draw for the second round took place on 30 March 2011.

The Second Round games were played on 25 April 2011.

Pool 1

Pool 2

Pool 3

Pool 4

Quarterfinals

The draw for the Quarterfinals was made on 2 May 2011 on MNS on RTÉ Two.

The Quarterfinal games were played on 06/27/28 June 2011.

Semi−Finals

The Semifinal games were played on the 8/23 August 2011.

Final

The final was played on Saturday 24 September 2011 in Turners Cross, Cork.

|}

Match

References

External links
 Official website
 2011 League of Ireland Cup at Soccerway

League of Ireland Cup seasons
3
Cup